George Alfred Arthur Chalkley (29 May 1883 – 7 January 1963) was an English footballer who played as a centre-half for West Ham United.

Born in Plaistow, George, was the brother of West Ham full-back Alf and Dartford left-back Charlie. He played for Custom House before joining West Ham United in 1908. He played seven Southern League games for the east London club during the 1908–09 season, the first a 1–0 victory at Upton Park against Southampton on 25 December 1908 and the last a 1–0 defeat at Luton Town on 30 January 1909.

Chalkley played for Hastings & St Leonards United for the 1909–10 campaign, the club's final season before they were dissolved.
The following season, he signed for Southend.

References

External links
George Chalkley at westhamstats.info

1883 births
1963 deaths
Footballers from Plaistow, Newham
English footballers
Association football central defenders
Custom House F.C. players
West Ham United F.C. players
Hastings & St Leonards United F.C. players
Southend United F.C. players
Southern Football League players